Marathon Digital Holdings, Inc. is a digital asset technology company, which engages in mining cryptocurrencies, with a focus on the blockchain ecosystem and the generation of digital assets. The company was founded on February 23, 2010 and is headquartered in Las Vegas, NV.
The company was formerly known as Marathon Patent Group and was the patent holding company that is the parent of Uniloc, allegedly a patent troll company.
Marathon purchased patents related to encryption in the 2010s and in 2021 it was known for its purchases of bitcoin and bitcoin mining equipment and a joint venture to use 37 MW from the Hardin Generating Station Montana coal plant to power an adjacently-constructed Marathon bitcoin data center.

The company changed its name to Marathon Digital Holdings, effective March 1, 2021. Its chief executive officer is Fred Thiel.

See also
 Uniloc v. Microsoft
 Uniloc

References

External links

Companies listed on the Nasdaq
Patent monetization companies of the United States